The Mossos d'Esquadra, also known as the Policia de la Generalitat de Catalunya and informally as Mossos, is the autonomous police force responsible for law enforcement in Spanish autonomous community of Catalonia.

They trace their origins back to squads formed in 1719.

History
On 21 July 1950 the Deputation of Barcelona was authorised to create a small security force using the historical title Mossos d'Esquadra. These new Mossos were a militarized corps having little similarity to the earlier incarnations, with limited powers and small numbers, which was in charge of protecting the government buildings of the Province of Barcelona.
With the return of democracy to Spain, the Mossos d'Esquadra grew in number and powers. Since 25 October 1980 the force has been under the authority of the Generalitat de Catalunya (the Government of Catalonia).

Previous Catalan forces
The corps was constituted as a militia to provide security to trade routes and fairs. It was created as a complement to the regular troops of the Bourbon army, which opposed the Miquelets, who survived as rebel supporters of Archduke Charles.

It was manned by local people, who had to speak Catalan and be familiar with the paths, caves and hiding places in the area. It was eventually placed under military jurisdiction but was less centralised than the Spanish police force (then known as the 'Intendencia General de Policía') formed in 1817, or the yet-to-be-established 'Guardia Civil', both of which were systematically deployed away from their home regions, and thus strangers to the places where they served. Throughout the centuries it has passed back and forth from Catalan authority to Spanish military command several times. They were dissolved in 1868 by General Prim after the fall of Queen Isabella II of Spain, since the Mossos had always been royalists.

They were reinstated in 1876 under the reign of Isabella's son king Alfonso XII of Spain, but only in the province of Barcelona. Under his son Alfonso XIII of Spain, the Mossos were not well regarded in Catalonia, especially by the Commonwealth of Catalonia, who paid them but had no control over them. They flourished, though, under Primo de Rivera's dictatorship. When the Second Spanish Republic was proclaimed, however, the Mossos sided with the Generalitat de Catalunya. After the Spanish Civil War, the last Mossos left Catalonia with the President of the Generalitat, and the corps was dissolved by the Francoist authorities.

Current role

The Mossos d'Esquadra have now replaced Guardia Civil and National Police within the territory of Catalonia. This process of substitution began in 1994 and was completed in 2008. In November 2005, the Mossos took full duties in the city of Barcelona.

The Statute of Autonomy of Catalonia (Catalan: Estatut d'Autonomia de Catalunya) defines that the scope of action of the Generalitat Police Force – Mossos d'Esquadra is the whole of the Catalan territory, and states that it exercises all the functions of a police force in the following fields:

 Public safety and public order.
 Administrative policing, including that deriving from State regulations.
 Judicial policing and criminal investigation, including the various forms of organised crime and terrorism, in the terms established by law.
 Patrolling and ensuring the safety of highways within Catalonia.

The Mossos d'Esquadra are a police force of the Spanish state placed under the authority of the Generalitat de Catalunya within the territory of the autonomous community of Catalonia. The National Police and the Civil Guard, on the other hand, are commanded directly by the Spanish ministry of the interior. They keep some officers in Catalonia to support the fight against terrorism, to handle identity documents, immigration and other limited responsibilities of the central government. However, when there was a dispute between the governments of Catalonia and of Spain about Catalonia becoming independent, and the Catalonian government called a referendum for 1 October 2017, the Spanish government sent thousands of members of the national Guardia Civil and Spanish National Police to Barcelona and Girona with the intention of preventing voting, as the referendum was deemed illegal by the Spanish Constitutional Court.

The sidearms officers can pick from are the Heckler & Koch USP or the Walther P99 both of which are chambered for 9×19mm. Regular Mossos can also use the Heckler & Koch UMP sub-machine gun which was seen in use by the Mossos during the 2017 Barcelona attacks in the hands of responding members.

The Mossos are trained in the Institut de Seguretat Pública de Catalunya (Public Safety Institute of Catalonia), which also trains local police officers.

Special intervention group (GEI)

Special intervention group (GEI) in Catalan: Grup Especial d'Intervenció.
The Special Intervention Groups AGEI (or simply GEI) is a Mossos d'Esquadra body specialized in interventions with a high risk of armed violence (such as terrorist detention, rescues of hostages, VIP protection, etc.). This group is under the command of the Intervention Division. In the USA the equivalent to this type of police is SWAT.

This group was created in 1984 with the collaboration of Spezialeinsatzkommando (SEK) of Germany It was kept secret in anticipation of the security challenges that would be posed with the holding of the Barcelona Olympic Games in 1992. In addition, the second reason for its creation was the transfer of responsibility for the prisons to the Generalitat de Catalonia that made it necessary to have a protocol to deal with riots and / or hostage-taking.

Later the GEI worked with the Special Operations Group (GEO) of the National Police Corps in 1991, which advised on various matters.

Becoming part of this force is not at all easy and it is necessary to pass a selection process that lasts one whole year: Up to 350 candidates applied to the intake in 2009, but only 11 were selected as suitable. The first phase, of a physical nature, consists of several tests of strength and resistance, medical and psychotechnical; It was then passed by 42 agents. The difficult phase of adaptation consists in an intense multidisciplinary training in which for 30 days the candidates are in isolation and suffer hard tests of physical resistance and sacrifice, in conditions of great hunger, sleep, cold and stress: Aspiring candidates have to overcome situations of high risk (such as throwing themselves into a void, carrying out a bridge jump without hesitation or screaming or showing fear, ...), vertigo situations, claustrophobia, a melée (although failure of this stage does not automatically mean elimination), thinking exercises during exhaustion (solving a puzzle after hours without sleep), etc. Out of the 2009 intake this phase was passed by 11 candidates. Then comes a third phase of training, of 750 hours (which actually ends up at more than 1000), to be carried out during the following six months. Finally the fourth and final phase is the period of practice, in which the aspirants are already integrated into the activities of the AGEI, which lasts for three months, which was only surpassed by 9 agents. (2,6% of the total)
Currently approximately 400 agents are formed, all that is related to this area is secret.

Armament
The force has a large quantity and variety of weapons. Each of the weapons is assigned only to one GEI The long list includes:

Pistols
 P30 Pistol – 9×19mm Parabellum.
 HK USP – 9×19mm Parabellum.
 FN Five-seveN– 5.7×28mm.
 Walther P99 9x19mm

Submachine guns
 MP-5 sub-machine gun – 9×19mm Parabellum.
 FN P90– 5.7×28mm.
 HK MP7 – 4.6×30mm.

Assault rifles
 HK G-36 – 5.56×45mm NATO.
 FN SCAR – 7.62×51mm NATO.
 HK 417 – 7.62×51mm NATO.

Shotguns
 Remington 870 – 12 gauge.

Sniper rifles
 Heckler & Koch PSG1 – 7.62×51mm NATO.
 SAKO TRG-22 – 7.62×51mm NATO.
 M110 Semi-Automatic Sniper System – 7.62×51mm NATO.
 AMP DSR-1 – .338 Lapua Magnum.
Of course, other equipment such as helmets, protection goggles, various types of vests (ballistic, antitrauma, among others), batons, battering rams to breach doors, ballistic shields, fiber optic cameras and many others.

In the most common interventions each one is equipped with a sub-machine gun and two pistols.

Vehicles
 The vehicles are Patrol and discreet, high-powered cars and vans. They also have an armored 4x4 vehicle (NIJ IV level). They also use helicopters from the Generalitat de Catalunya.

Controversies and legal cases 
Controversies related to the Mossos d'Esquadra include:

 In 2008 three Mossos were condemned to six years of imprisonment for the torture and injury of an alleged delinquent who was later proven not guilty. Later, in 2009 the Tribunal Supremo reduced the sentence. And finally in 2012 they were paroled.
 In 2016 six agents were detained for their involvement in a cardiac failure of a businessman in the Raval neighbourhood.
 In 2017, the central government suspended the Chief of Police Major Trapero during the 2017–18 Spanish constitutional crisis, and also placed the force under investigation. The Mossos were eventually cleared of any wrongdoing and Trapero was reinstated.

Gallery

See also
Guàrdia Urbana de Barcelona
Corps of Firefighters of Catalonia
Declaration of Independence of Catalonia
Military History Of Catalonia
Sherwood Syndrome

References

External links

Official web page of the Mossos d'Esquadra
Official web page of the Local Police Forces of Catalonia

Catalan law
Regional law enforcement agencies of Spain